Lieutenant General Piet Coetser was a lieutenant general in the South African Army, who served as Chief of Logistics from 1 April 1998 to 2000.

Early life

He grew up in a military family as his father was a World War II veteran. Wilhelmus J. Coetser - his father - was also a logistician. He would later become Directing Staff at the Military College, OC South West Africa Command and finally Chief Director Logistical Support at Log Division.

Military career

Pieter was a graduate of Military Academy, Stellenbosch University and the South African Army College. He served in the Border War as an OC of a Forward Logistics Component. He served as an Assistant Military Attaché to the United States of America and afterwards OC SA Army Logistical Command from 1989 with the rank of brigadier. He was one of the Project officers during integration, welcoming returning MK troops at the Air Force Base Hoedspruit. He was appointed at the Chief of Army Staff Logistics and in 1998 he was promoted to lieutenant general. He was appointed as the Chief of Logistics. His final appointment was as Chief of Joint Support at the Defense Secretariat. He died in April 2000.

Awards and decorations

References

South African generals
2000 deaths
Military attachés